The Nyonoksa radiation accident, Arkhangelsk explosion or Nyonoksa explosion occurred on 8 August 2019 near Nyonoksa, a village under the administrative jurisdiction of Severodvinsk, Arkhangelsk Oblast, Russian Federation. Five military and civilian specialists were killed and three (or six, depending on the source) were injured.

Background
Between November 2017 and 26 February 2018, Russia conducted four tests of the 9M730 Burevestnik nuclear-powered cruise missile, launched from other test sites. According to the United States intelligence community, only the flight test in November 2017 from Pankovo test site was moderately successful with all of the others ending in failure. According to Russia, none of the tests ended in failure. During recovery efforts later in 2018, Russia used three ships, one capable of handling radioactive material from the weapon nuclear core, to bring the missile tested in November 2017 from the seabed of Barents Sea back to the surface. Based on satellite images, the Nyonoksa test site copies those at Kapustin Yar and Pankovo, where 9M730 Burevestnik was tested.

Accident
The accident occurred at the State Central Navy Testing Range which is the main rocket launching site of the Russian Navy and is also called Nyonoksa. According to the version presented by Russian officials, it was a result of a failed test of an "isotope power source for a liquid-fuelled rocket engine". Nonproliferation expert Jeffrey Lewis and Federation of American Scientists fellow Ankit Panda suspect the incident resulted from a Burevestnik cruise missile test. However, other arms control experts disputed the assertions: Ian Williams of the Center for Strategic and International Studies and James Acton of the Carnegie Endowment for International Peace expressed skepticism over Moscow's financial and technical capabilities to field the weapon, while Michael Kofman of the Wilson Center concluded that the explosion was probably not related to Burevestnik but instead to the testing of another military platform. According to CNBC, the Russians were trying to recover a missile from the seabed which was lost during a previously failed test. No NOTAMs were filed prior to the explosion to warn pilots of a possible missile test. In the past, the residents of Nyonoksa had been warned and evacuated prior to the missile tests. Also, two Russian special purpose ships were at the Nyonoksa test range when the explosion occurred: the Serebryanka (Rosatom Flot vessel used for handling nuclear waste from nuclear reactors) and the Zvezdochka (used for underwater salvage operations and is equipped with two heavy lift sea cranes and two underwater unmanned robots). 

An event of explosive nature was registered on 8 August at 06:00 UTC (local time 09:00) at the infrasound station in Bardufoss (Troms, Norway). As the event was also registered on seismic data, it must have been coupled to the ground, meaning that it took place either at the ground or in contact with it; for example on water. The timing and location of the event coincides with the reported accident in Archangelsk. Several fishermen stated on sanatatur.ru that they witnessed the accident: one saw a 100-meter column of water rise into the air after the explosion and another saw a large hole in the side of a ship which had been at the site of the explosion.

Aftermath
In the aftermath of the explosion, three of the victims were treated at the Semashko Medical Center in Arkhangelsk, which had radiation treatment expertise and employed the use of hazmat suits, while three others were taken to the Arkhangelsk Regional Clinical Hospital, arriving at 4:35 p.m. on 8 August, where the hospital staff were not warned of the radiation exposure. Several Arkhangelsk Regional Hospital staff were later flown to Moscow for radiation testing. One doctor was found to test positive for Cesium-137, though the levels remain unknown, as the medical staff involved were forced to sign non-disclosure agreements.

According to an unnamed medical worker, two injured by the explosion died of radiation sickness en route from Arkhangelsk Regional Clinical Hospital (AOKB) to treatment in Moscow. Their bodies were sent to Moscow's Burnazyan Federal Medical and Biophysical Center (FMBC). Six persons with severe injuries from the explosion and radiation exposure were delivered to Burnazyan by two medivac flights and ambulances with special plastic seals, with paramedics wearing chemical protective suits, and, because an operating room apron was highly contaminated after an operation, all Arkhangelsk Regional Hospital doctors, nurses, and staff who came into contact with the injured were sent to Burnazyan, too. The rooms at the Arkangelsk hospital, where injured victims had been treated, were sealed after treatment but none of the hospital workers and staff had worn anti-contamination clothing.

Five immediate deaths
On Monday 12 August 2019, flags in Sarov were lowered to half-staff during the viewing of five coffins in Sarov's main square. These were the bodies of five Rosatom (RFNC-VNIIEF) workers who were killed during and immediately following the 8 August 2019 explosion. Later, on 12 August 2019, their bodies were buried in Sarov's main cemetery. On 21 November 2019, they were posthumously awarded the Order of Courage.

Radiation levels
Yuri Peshkov from the Roshidromet, the Russian meteorology service, stated that background radiation levels peaked at 4-16 times normal levels at six of its eight stations in Severodvinsk,  to the east, reaching 1.78 microsieverts per hour shortly after the explosion, but returned to normal levels 2.5 hours after the explosion. The administration in Severodvinsk reported elevated radiation levels for 40 minutes leading to a rush on medical iodine. In the days following the event several monitoring stations in Russia stopped sending data to the Comprehensive Nuclear-Test-Ban Treaty Organization (CTBTO), a data network for radiation monitoring made of 80 stations around the world.

According to the information posted by Roshydromet on radiation situation in Severodvinsk in the hours following the accident, a number of short-lived isotopes were discovered: strontium-91, barium-139, barium-140 and lanthanum-140. Norwegian nuclear safety expert Nils Bøhmer stated that such isotope composition proves a nuclear reactor was involved in the accident.

On 2 September, Belomorkanal news agency published a video showcasing two abandoned pontoons near the mouth of where the Nyonoksa River empties into the Dvina Bay only 4 km from the center of Nyonoksa, with one of them carrying an array of heavily damaged testing equipment. According to Nyonoksa residents, the first pontoon "PP PP Plant No. 2" with two  blue containers washed ashore on 9 August and the heavily damaged second pontoon with a damaged crane, a  blue container and a yellow container similar to a Siempelkamp container for highly radioactive materials was towed by tugboats to a site near the first pontoon about five days after the explosion. Nyonoksa residents said that just days prior to the 31 August measurements, the gamma ray radiation levels were 750 μR/hour at the same location. Alpha and beta radiation levels have not been measured. , the site has been neither enclosed nor guarded and no radiation warning signs have been observed.

The agency could not determine if the detection was linked to the accident, and, according to Reuters, such iodine measurements were not unusual as monitoring stations in Norway detected radioactive iodine about six to eight times a year and also were usually unable to determine the source of the isotope.

Evacuation of population
According to the local press, it was announced that about 450 inhabitants of the Nyonoksa village had to be evacuated by train for two hours on 14 August then this evacuation would have been canceled. According to The Moscow Times quoting RIA Novosti, residents of Nyonoksa will be evacuated each month by special train for two hours (early Wednesday morning) for planned military activities in the city; evacuation that according to a villager already exists:  it is expected, everyone is taken from the village about once a month, even if some remained behind. But now, after the last events, I think everyone will leave. The governor of the Arkhangelsk region (Igor Orlov) denied that the evacuation was an emergency, saying it was a routine measure, already "planned".

Reactions
 : Although initially denied, involvement of radioactive materials in the accident was later confirmed by Russian officials. On 13 August, the authorities initiated evacuation of the village of Nyonoksa. On 14 August the evacuation was cancelled. On 26 August, Aleksei Karpov, Russia's envoy to international organizations in Vienna, stated that the accident was linked to the development of weapons which Russia had to begin creating as "one of the tit-for-tat measures in the wake of the United States’ withdrawal from the Anti-Ballistic Missile Treaty". On 21 November, at the ceremony of presentation of posthumous awards to the dead men's families, Vladimir Putin stated that the scientists killed in the August 8th explosion had been testing an “unparalleled” weapon: “We are talking about the most advanced and unparalleled technical ideas and solutions about weapons design to ensure Russia’s sovereignty and security for decades to come". He also noted that the "weapon is to be perfected regardless of anything". On 22 November 2019, Dmitry Peskov, Putin's Press Secretary, stated that the investigation into the explosion will not be made public.
: On 12 August a tweet from US president Donald Trump suggested that the accident was a failed Burevestnik test. In the tweet Burevestnik was referred to by its NATO reporting name "Skyfall". On 10 October, Thomas DiNanno, member of the United States delegation to the United Nations General Assembly First Committee, stated that the "August 8th 'Skyfall' incident [...] was the result of a nuclear reaction that occurred during the recovery of a Russian nuclear-powered cruise missile", which "remained on the bed of the White Sea since its failed test early last year". On 14 October, three United States diplomats were removed from the Nyonoksa-Severodvinsk train; Russia accused the diplomats of attempting to enter the closed city of Severodvinsk without the official permission, stating the diplomats had told Russia they were visiting Arkhangelsk, which wasn't within a restricted zone, but then traveled to the closed area next to the test site. The US Embassy in Russia and the State Department confirmed the incident, stating the diplomats were on official travel and had informed Russian authorities of their travel in advance.

See also
9M730 Burevestnik, Russian nuclear-powered cruise missile, allegedly involved in the accident
List of military nuclear accidents
Nuclear and radiation accidents and incidents
Andreev Bay nuclear accident
Kramatorsk radiological accident
Kyshtym disaster

Notes

References

External links 
 
 
 
 
 

2019 in Russia
Explosions in 2019
Explosions in Russia
2019 health disasters
Nuclear accidents and incidents
2019 disasters in Russia